USS Dash is a name used more than once by the U.S. Navy in naming its ships:

 , was launched 20 June 1942 by Commercial Iron Works, Portland, Oregon.
 , was launched 20 September 1952 by Astoria Marine Construction Co., Astoria, Oregon.

United States Navy ship names